The Agreement between the Allied and Associated Powers with Regard to the Contribution to the Cost of Liberation of the Territories of the Former Austro-Hungarian Monarchy was concluded on 10 September 1919 and complemented the Saint-Germain peace treaty with Austria. 

It was concluded between the governments of Italy and the other main Allied Powers of the First World War in order to regulate the issue of war reparations exacted from the Austrian government in the peace treaty. Since most of the territories of the Austro-Hungarian Empire were now ceded either to existing states (such as Italy and Romania) or were incorporated into newly created states (such as Czechoslovakia, Yugoslavia and Poland), it was decided that some of the war reparations due to be exacted from the Austrian government would be actually exacted from the former territories of its empire that were now in the hands of other states.

Article I of the treaty acknowledged the Italian sacrifices in the war, and accepted the Italian willingness to pay part of the reparations from the territories Italy got from Austria as the result of the war (South Tyrol). Articles II-IV set the ratio between reparations to be borne by the Austrian government and those to be borne by the territories newly added to Italy.

The treaty was registered in the League of Nations Treaty Series on 21 October 1920. 

The agreement was modified by a declaration issued by the signatory parties on 8 December 1919, which allowed the Italian government to issue bonds over a longer period of time to pay off its debts.

See also 
 Treaty of Saint-Germain-en-Laye (1919)
 Agreement between the Allied and Associated Powers with Regard to the Contribution to the Cost of Liberation of the Territories of the Former Austro-Hungarian Monarchy

Notes

External links 
 text of the agreement

Interwar-period treaties
Treaties concluded in 1919
Treaties entered into force in 1920
Treaties of the United Kingdom (1801–1922)
Treaties of the French Third Republic
Treaties of the Kingdom of Italy (1861–1946)
Treaties of the United States
Treaties of Belgium
Treaties of the Republic of China (1912–1949)
Treaties of Cuba
Treaties of the Kingdom of Greece
Treaties of the Empire of Japan
Treaties of Nicaragua
Treaties of Panama
Treaties of the Second Polish Republic
Treaties of the Portuguese First Republic
Treaties of the Kingdom of Romania
Treaties of the Kingdom of Yugoslavia
Treaties of Thailand
Treaties of Czechoslovakia
Reparations